Events in the year 1826 in Brazil.

Incumbents
 Monarch – Pedro I

Events

Births
 10 January - Francisco Paulo de Almeida

Deaths
 11 December - Maria Leopoldina of Austria

References

 
1820s in Brazil
Years of the 19th century in Brazil
Brazil
Brazil